Mehmet Enes Sığırcı (born 24 February 1993) is a Turkish professional footballer who plays for the amateur side Hendekspor.

References

External links 
 
 
 

1993 births
People from Güngören
Footballers from Istanbul
Living people
Turkish footballers
Turkey youth international footballers
Association football central defenders
24 Erzincanspor footballers
Hatayspor footballers
Mersin İdman Yurdu footballers
Yeni Malatyaspor footballers
Manisaspor footballers
Altınordu F.K. players
Niğde Anadolu FK footballers
Süper Lig players
TFF First League players
TFF Second League players
TFF Third League players